In quantum mechanics, the uncertainty principle (also known as Heisenberg's uncertainty principle) is any of a variety of mathematical inequalities asserting a fundamental limit to the accuracy with which the values for certain pairs of physical quantities of a particle, such as position, x, and momentum, p, can be predicted from initial conditions.

Such variable pairs are known as complementary variables or canonically conjugate variables; and, depending on interpretation, the uncertainty principle limits to what extent such conjugate properties maintain their approximate meaning, as the mathematical framework of quantum physics does not support the notion of simultaneously well-defined conjugate properties expressed by a single value. The uncertainty principle implies that it is in general not possible to predict the value of a quantity with arbitrary certainty, even if all initial conditions are specified.

Introduced first in 1927 by the German physicist Werner Heisenberg, the uncertainty principle states that the more precisely the position of some particle is determined, the less precisely its momentum can be predicted from initial conditions, and vice versa. In the published 1927 paper, Heisenberg originally concluded that the uncertainty principle was ΔpΔq ≈ h using the full Planck constant. The formal inequality relating the standard deviation of position σx and the standard deviation of momentum σp was derived by Earle Hesse Kennard later that year and by Hermann Weyl in 1928:

where  is the reduced Planck constant).

Historically, the uncertainty principle has been confused with a related effect in physics, called the observer effect, which notes that measurements of certain systems cannot be made without affecting the system, that is, without changing something in a system. Heisenberg utilized such an observer effect at the quantum level (see below) as a physical "explanation" of quantum uncertainty. It has since become clearer, however, that the uncertainty principle is inherent in the properties of all wave-like systems, and that it arises in quantum mechanics simply due to the matter wave nature of all quantum objects. Thus, the uncertainty principle actually states a fundamental property of quantum systems and is not a statement about the observational success of current technology. Indeed the uncertainty principle has its roots in how we apply calculus to write the basic equations of mechanics. It must be emphasized that measurement does not mean only a process in which a physicist-observer takes part, but rather any interaction between classical and quantum objects regardless of any observer.

Since the uncertainty principle is such a basic result in quantum mechanics, typical experiments in quantum mechanics routinely observe aspects of it. Certain experiments, however, may deliberately test a particular form of the uncertainty principle as part of their main research program. These include, for example, tests of number–phase uncertainty relations in superconducting or quantum optics systems. Applications dependent on the uncertainty principle for their operation include extremely low-noise technology such as that required in gravitational wave interferometers.

Introduction

It is vital to illustrate how the principle applies to relatively intelligible physical situations since it is indiscernible on the macroscopic scales that humans experience. Two alternative frameworks for quantum physics offer different explanations for the uncertainty principle. The wave mechanics picture of the uncertainty principle is more visually intuitive, but the more abstract matrix mechanics picture formulates it in a way that generalizes more easily.

Mathematically, in wave mechanics, the uncertainty relation between position and momentum arises because the expressions of the wavefunction in the two corresponding orthonormal bases in Hilbert space are Fourier transforms of one another (i.e., position and momentum are conjugate variables). A nonzero function and its Fourier transform cannot both be sharply localized at the same time. A similar tradeoff between the variances of Fourier conjugates arises in all systems underlain by Fourier analysis, for example in sound waves: A pure tone is a sharp spike at a single frequency, while its Fourier transform gives the shape of the sound wave in the time domain, which is a completely delocalized sine wave. In quantum mechanics, the two key points are that the position of the particle takes the form of a matter wave, and momentum is its Fourier conjugate, assured by the de Broglie relation , where  is the wavenumber.

In matrix mechanics, the mathematical formulation of quantum mechanics, any pair of non-commuting self-adjoint operators representing observables are subject to similar uncertainty limits. An eigenstate of an observable represents the state of the wavefunction for a certain measurement value (the eigenvalue). For example, if a measurement of an observable  is performed, then the system is in a particular eigenstate  of that observable. However, the particular eigenstate of the observable  need not be an eigenstate of another observable : If so, then it does not have a unique associated measurement for it, as the system is not in an eigenstate of that observable.

Wave mechanics interpretation
(Ref )

According to the de Broglie hypothesis, every object in the universe is a wave, i.e., a situation which gives rise to this phenomenon. The position of the particle is described by a wave function . The time-independent wave function of a single-moded plane wave of wavenumber k0 or momentum p0 is

The Born rule states that this should be interpreted as a probability density amplitude function in the sense that the probability of finding the particle between a and b is

In the case of the single-moded plane wave,  is a uniform distribution. In other words, the particle position is extremely uncertain in the sense that it could be essentially anywhere along the wave packet.

On the other hand, consider a wave function that is a sum of many waves, which we may write as

where An represents the relative contribution of the mode pn to the overall total. The figures to the right show how with the addition of many plane waves, the wave packet can become more localized. We may take this a step further to the continuum limit, where the wave function is an integral over all possible modes

with  representing the amplitude of these modes and is called the wave function in momentum space. Adding together all of these plane waves comes at a cost, namely the momentum has become less precise, having become a mixture of waves of many different momenta.

One way to quantify the precision of the position and momentum is the standard deviation σ. Since  is a probability density function for position, we calculate its standard deviation.

The precision of the position is improved, i.e. reduced σx, by using many plane waves, thereby weakening the precision of the momentum, i.e. increased σp. Another way of stating this is that σx and σp have an inverse relationship or are at least bounded from below. This is the uncertainty principle, the exact limit of which is the Kennard bound. Click the show button below to see a semi-formal derivation of the Kennard inequality using wave mechanics.

Matrix mechanics interpretation
(Ref )

In matrix mechanics, observables such as position and momentum are represented by self-adjoint operators. When considering pairs of observables, an important quantity is the commutator.

In the case of position and momentum, the commutator is the canonical commutation relation

The physical meaning of the non-commutativity can be understood by considering the effect of the commutator on position and momentum eigenstates. Let  be a right eigenstate of position with a constant eigenvalue . By definition, this means that  Applying the commutator to  yields

where  is the identity operator.

Suppose, for the sake of proof by contradiction, that  is also a right eigenstate of momentum, with constant eigenvalue . If this were true, then one could write

On the other hand, the above canonical commutation relation requires that

This implies that no quantum state can simultaneously be both a position and a momentum eigenstate.

When a state is measured, it is projected onto an eigenstate in the basis of the relevant observable. For example, if a particle's position is measured, then the state amounts to a position eigenstate. This means that the state is not a momentum eigenstate, however, but rather it can be represented as a sum of multiple momentum basis eigenstates. In other words, the momentum must be less precise. This precision may be quantified by the standard deviations,

As in the wave mechanics interpretation above, one sees a tradeoff between the respective precisions of the two, quantified by the uncertainty principle.

Heisenberg limit
In quantum metrology, and especially interferometry, the Heisenberg limit is the optimal rate at which the accuracy of a measurement can scale with the energy used in the measurement. Typically, this is the measurement of a phase (applied to one arm of a beam-splitter) and the energy is given by the number of photons used in an interferometer. Although some claim to have broken the Heisenberg limit, this reflects disagreement on the definition of the scaling resource. Suitably defined, the Heisenberg limit is a consequence of the basic principles of quantum mechanics and cannot be beaten, although the weak Heisenberg limit can be beaten.

Robertson–Schrödinger uncertainty relations
The most common general form of the uncertainty principle is the Robertson uncertainty relation.

For an arbitrary Hermitian operator  we can associate a standard deviation

where the brackets  indicate an expectation value.

In this notation, the Robertson uncertainty relation is given by

The Robertson uncertainty relation immediately follows from a slightly stronger inequality, the Schrödinger uncertainty relation,

where we have introduced the anticommutator,

Mixed states
The Robertson–Schrödinger uncertainty relation may be generalized in a straightforward way to describe mixed states.

The Maccone–Pati uncertainty relations
The Robertson–Schrödinger uncertainty relation can be trivial if the state of the system is chosen to be eigenstate of one of the observable. The stronger uncertainty relations proved by Maccone and Pati give non-trivial bounds on the sum of the variances for two incompatible observables. (Earlier works on uncertainty relations formulated as the sum of variances include, e.g., Ref. due to Huang.) For two non-commuting observables  and  the first stronger uncertainty relation is given by

The second stronger uncertainty relation is given by

However, when  is an eigenstate of one of the two observables the Heisenberg–Schrödinger uncertainty relation becomes trivial. But the lower bound in the new relation is nonzero unless  is an eigenstate of both.

Improving the Robertson–Schrödinger uncertainty relation based on decompositions of the density matrix

The Robertson–Schrödinger uncertainty can be improved noting that it must hold for all components  in any decomposition of the density matrix given as

Here, for the probailities  and  hold. Then, using the relation

it follows that

where the function in the bound is defined

The above relation very often has a bound larger than that of the original Robertson–Schrödinger uncertainty relation. Thus, we need to calculate the bound of the Robertson–Schrödinger uncertainty for the mixed components of the quantum state rather than for the quantum state, and compute an average of their square roots. The following expression is stronger than the Robertson–Schrödinger uncertainty relation

where on the right-hand side there is a concave roof over the decompositions of the density matrix.
The improved relation above is saturated by all single-qubit quantum states.

With similar arguments, one can derive a relation with a convex roof on the right-hand side

where  denotes the quantum Fisher information and the density matrix is decomposed to pure states as

The derivation takes advantage of the fact that the quantum Fisher information is the convex roof of the variance times four.

A simpler inequality follows without a convex roof

which is stronger than the Heisenberg uncertainty relation, since for the quantum Fisher information we have

while for pure states the equality holds.

Phase space
In the phase space formulation of quantum mechanics, the Robertson–Schrödinger relation follows from a positivity condition on a real star-square function. Given a Wigner function  with star product ★ and a function f, the following is generally true:

Choosing , we arrive at

Since this positivity condition is true for all a, b, and c, it follows that all the eigenvalues of the matrix are non-negative.

The non-negative eigenvalues then imply a corresponding non-negativity condition on the determinant,

or, explicitly, after algebraic manipulation,

Examples

Since the Robertson and Schrödinger relations are for general operators, the relations can be applied to any two observables to obtain specific uncertainty relations. A few of the most common relations found in the literature are given below.
 For position and linear momentum, the canonical commutation relation  implies the Kennard inequality from above: 
 For two orthogonal components of the total angular momentum operator of an object:  where i, j, k are distinct, and Ji denotes angular momentum along the xi axis. This relation implies that unless all three components vanish together, only a single component of a system's angular momentum can be defined with arbitrary precision, normally the component parallel to an external (magnetic or electric) field.
  In non-relativistic mechanics, time is privileged as an independent variable. Nevertheless, in 1945, L. I. Mandelshtam and I. E. Tamm derived a non-relativistic time–energy uncertainty relation, as follows. For a quantum system in a non-stationary state  and an observable B represented by a self-adjoint operator , the following formula holds:  where σE is the standard deviation of the energy operator (Hamiltonian) in the state , σB stands for the standard deviation of B. Although the second factor in the left-hand side has dimension of time, it is different from the time parameter that enters the Schrödinger equation. It is a lifetime of the state  with respect to the observable B: In other words, this is the time interval (Δt) after which the expectation value  changes appreciably. An informal, heuristic meaning of the principle is the following: A state that only exists for a short time cannot have a definite energy. To have a definite energy, the frequency of the state must be defined accurately, and this requires the state to hang around for many cycles, the reciprocal of the required accuracy. For example, in spectroscopy, excited states have a finite lifetime. By the time–energy uncertainty principle, they do not have a definite energy, and, each time they decay, the energy they release is slightly different. The average energy of the outgoing photon has a peak at the theoretical energy of the state, but the distribution has a finite width called the natural linewidth. Fast-decaying states have a broad linewidth, while slow-decaying states have a narrow linewidth. The same linewidth effect also makes it difficult to specify the rest mass of unstable, fast-decaying particles in particle physics. The faster the particle decays (the shorter its lifetime), the less certain is its mass (the larger the particle's width).
 For the number of electrons in a superconductor and the phase of its Ginzburg–Landau order parameter

A counterexample
Suppose we consider a quantum particle on a ring, where the wave function depends on an angular variable , which we may take to lie in the interval .

and

These operators satisfy the usual commutation relations for position and momentum operators, .

These states are normalizable, unlike the eigenstates of the momentum operator on the line. Also the operator  is bounded, since  ranges over a bounded interval.

(These also furnish an example of operators satisfying the canonical commutation relations but not the Weyl relations.)

Examples
(Refs )

Quantum harmonic oscillator stationary states

Consider a one-dimensional quantum harmonic oscillator. It is possible to express the position and momentum operators in terms of the creation and annihilation operators:

Using the standard rules for creation and annihilation operators on the energy eigenstates,

the variances may be computed directly,

The product of these standard deviations is then

In particular, the above Kennard bound is saturated for the ground state , for which the probability density is just the normal distribution.

Quantum harmonic oscillators with Gaussian initial condition

In a quantum harmonic oscillator of characteristic angular frequency ω, place a state that is offset from the bottom of the potential by some displacement x0 as

where Ω describes the width of the initial state but need not be the same as ω. Through integration over the propagator, we can solve for the -dependent solution. After many cancelations, the probability densities reduce to

where we have used the notation  to denote a normal distribution of mean μ and variance σ2. Copying the variances above and applying trigonometric identities, we can write the product of the standard deviations as

From the relations

we can conclude the following: (the right most equality holds only when Ω = ω) .

Coherent states

A coherent state is a right eigenstate of the annihilation operator,

which may be represented in terms of Fock states as

In the picture where the coherent state is a massive particle in a quantum harmonic oscillator, the position and momentum operators may be expressed in terms of the annihilation operators in the same formulas above and used to calculate the variances,

Therefore, every coherent state saturates the Kennard bound

with position and momentum each contributing an amount  in a "balanced" way. Moreover, every squeezed coherent state also saturates the Kennard bound although the individual contributions of position and momentum need not be balanced in general.

Particle in a box

Consider a particle in a one-dimensional box of length . The eigenfunctions in position and momentum space are

and

where  and we have used the de Broglie relation .

The product of the standard deviations is therefore

For all , the quantity  is greater than 1, so the uncertainty principle is never violated. For numerical concreteness, the smallest value occurs when , in which case

Constant momentum

Assume a particle initially has a momentum space wave function described by a normal distribution around some constant momentum p0 according to

where we have introduced a reference scale , with  describing the width of the distribution—cf. nondimensionalization. If the state is allowed to evolve in free space, then the time-dependent momentum and position space wave functions are

On the other hand, the standard deviation of the position is

such that the uncertainty product can only increase with time as

Additional uncertainty relations

Systematic and statistical errors

The inequalities above focus on the statistical imprecision of observables as quantified by the standard deviation . Heisenberg's original version, however, was dealing with the systematic error, a disturbance of the quantum system produced by the measuring apparatus, i.e., an observer effect.

If we let  represent the error (i.e., inaccuracy) of a measurement of an observable A and  the disturbance produced on a subsequent measurement of the conjugate variable B by the former measurement of A, then the inequality proposed by Ozawa — encompassing both systematic and statistical errors — holds:

Heisenberg's uncertainty principle, as originally described in the 1927 formulation, mentions only the first term of Ozawa inequality, regarding the systematic error. Using the notation above to describe the error/disturbance effect of sequential measurements (first A, then B), it could be written as

The formal derivation of the Heisenberg relation is possible but far from intuitive. It was not proposed by Heisenberg, but formulated in a mathematically consistent way only in recent years.
There is increasing experimental evidence that the total quantum uncertainty cannot be described by the Heisenberg term alone, but requires the presence of all the three terms of the Ozawa inequality.

Using the same formalism, it is also possible to introduce the other kind of physical situation, often confused with the previous one, namely the case of simultaneous measurements (A and B at the same time):

The two simultaneous measurements on A and B are necessarily unsharp or weak.

It is also possible to derive an uncertainty relation that, as the Ozawa's one, combines both the statistical and systematic error components, but keeps a form very close to the Heisenberg original inequality. By adding Robertson

and Ozawa relations we obtain

The four terms can be written as:

Defining:

as the inaccuracy in the measured values of the variable A and

as the resulting fluctuation in the conjugate variable B,
Fujikawa established an uncertainty relation similar to the Heisenberg original one, but valid both for systematic and statistical errors:

Quantum entropic uncertainty principle
For many distributions, the standard deviation is not a particularly natural way of quantifying the structure. For example, uncertainty relations in which one of the observables is an angle has little physical meaning for fluctuations larger than one period. Other examples include highly bimodal distributions, or unimodal distributions with divergent variance.

A solution that overcomes these issues is an uncertainty based on entropic uncertainty instead of the product of variances. While formulating the many-worlds interpretation of quantum mechanics in 1957, Hugh Everett III conjectured a stronger extension of the uncertainty principle based on entropic certainty. This conjecture, also studied by Hirschman and proven in 1975 by Beckner and by Iwo Bialynicki-Birula and Jerzy Mycielski is that, for two normalized, dimensionless Fourier transform pairs  and  where
 and  
the Shannon information entropies

and

are subject to the following constraint,

where the logarithms may be in any base.

The probability distribution functions associated with the position wave function  and the momentum wave function  have dimensions of inverse length and momentum respectively, but the entropies may be rendered dimensionless by

Note that the entropies will be functions of these chosen parameters. Due to the Fourier transform relation between the position wave function  and the momentum wavefunction , the above constraint can be written for the corresponding entropies as

where  is Planck's constant.

Depending on one's choice of the  product, the expression may be written in many ways. If  is chosen to be , then

If, instead,  is chosen to be , then

where  is interpreted as a dimensionless number equal to the value of Planck's constant in the chosen system of units. Note that these inequalities can be extended to multimode quantum states, or wavefunctions in more than one spatial dimension.

The quantum entropic uncertainty principle is more restrictive than the Heisenberg uncertainty principle. From the inverse logarithmic Sobolev inequalities

(equivalently, from the fact that normal distributions maximize the entropy of all such with a given variance), it readily follows that this entropic uncertainty principle is stronger than the one based on standard deviations, because

In other words, the Heisenberg uncertainty principle, is a consequence of the quantum entropic uncertainty principle, but not vice versa. A few remarks on these inequalities. First, the choice of base e is a matter of popular convention in physics. The logarithm can alternatively be in any base, provided that it be consistent on both sides of the inequality. Second, recall the Shannon entropy has been used, not the quantum von Neumann entropy. Finally, the normal distribution saturates the inequality, and it is the only distribution with this property, because it is the maximum entropy probability distribution among those with fixed variance (cf. here for proof).

A measurement apparatus will have a finite resolution set by the discretization of its possible outputs into bins, with the probability of lying within one of the bins given by the Born rule. We will consider the most common experimental situation, in which the bins are of uniform size. Let δx be a measure of the spatial resolution. We take the zeroth bin to be centered near the origin, with possibly some small constant offset c. The probability of lying within the jth interval of width δx is

To account for this discretization, we can define the Shannon entropy of the wave function for a given measurement apparatus as

Under the above definition, the entropic uncertainty relation is

Here we note that  is a typical infinitesimal phase space volume used in the calculation of a partition function. The inequality is also strict and not saturated. Efforts to improve this bound are an active area of research.

Uncertainty relation with three angular momentum components

For a particle of spin- the following uncertainty relation holds

where  are angular momentum components. The relation can be derived from

and

The relation can be strengthened as

where  is the quantum Fisher information.

Harmonic analysis

In the context of harmonic analysis, a branch of mathematics, the uncertainty principle implies that one cannot at the same time localize the value of a function and its Fourier transform. To wit, the following inequality holds,

Further mathematical uncertainty inequalities, including the above entropic uncertainty, hold between a function  and its Fourier transform :

Signal processing 
In the context of signal processing, and in particular time–frequency analysis, uncertainty principles are referred to as the Gabor limit, after Dennis Gabor, or sometimes the Heisenberg–Gabor limit. The basic result, which follows from "Benedicks's theorem", below, is that a function cannot be both time limited and band limited (a function and its Fourier transform cannot both have bounded domain)—see bandlimited versus timelimited. More accurately, the time-bandwidth or duration-bandwidth product satisfies

The minimum is attained for a Gaussian-shaped pulse (Gabor wavelet) [For the un-squared Gaussian (i.e. signal amplitude) and its un-squared Fourier transform magnitude ; squaring reduces each  by a factor .] Another common measure is the product of the time and frequency full width at half maximum (of the power/energy), which for the Gaussian equals  (see bandwidth-limited pulse).

Stated alternatively, "One cannot simultaneously sharply localize a signal (function ) in both the time domain and frequency domain (its Fourier transform)".

When applied to filters, the result implies that one cannot achieve high temporal resolution and frequency resolution at the same time; a concrete example are the resolution issues of the short-time Fourier transform—if one uses a wide window, one achieves good frequency resolution at the cost of temporal resolution, while a narrow window has the opposite trade-off.

Alternate theorems give more precise quantitative results, and, in time–frequency analysis, rather than interpreting the (1-dimensional) time and frequency domains separately, one instead interprets the limit as a lower limit on the support of a function in the (2-dimensional) time–frequency plane. In practice, the Gabor limit limits the simultaneous time–frequency resolution one can achieve without interference; it is possible to achieve higher resolution, but at the cost of different components of the signal interfering with each other.

As a result, in order to analyze signals where the transients are important, the wavelet transform is often used instead of the Fourier.

Discrete Fourier transform
Let  be a sequence of N complex numbers and  its discrete Fourier transform.

Denote by  the number of non-zero elements in the time sequence  and by  the number of non-zero elements in the frequency sequence . Then,

This inequality is sharp, with equality achieved when x or X is a Dirac mass, or more generally when x is a nonzero multiple of a Dirac comb supported on a subgroup of the integers modulo N (in which case X is also a Dirac comb supported on a complementary subgroup, and vice versa).

More generally, if T and W are subsets of the integers modulo N, let  denote the time-limiting operator and band-limiting operators, respectively. Then

where the norm is the operator norm of operators on the Hilbert space  of functions on the integers modulo N. This inequality has implications for signal reconstruction.

When N is a prime number, a stronger inequality holds:

Discovered by Terence Tao, this inequality is also sharp.

Benedicks's theorem
Amrein–Berthier and Benedicks's theorem intuitively says that the set of points where  is non-zero and the set of points where  is non-zero cannot both be small.

A more quantitative version is

Hardy's uncertainty principle

and
 ( an integer),

then, if , while if , then there is a polynomial  of degree  such that

This was later improved as follows: if  is such that

then

This result was stated in Beurling's complete works without proof and proved in Hörmander (the case ) and Bonami, Demange, and Jaming for the general case. Note that Hörmander–Beurling's version implies the case  in Hardy's Theorem while the version by Bonami–Demange–Jaming covers the full strength of Hardy's Theorem. A different proof of Beurling's theorem based on Liouville's theorem appeared in ref.

A full description of the case  as well as the following extension to Schwartz class distributions appears in ref.

History
Werner Heisenberg formulated the uncertainty principle at Niels Bohr's institute in Copenhagen, while working on the mathematical foundations of quantum mechanics.

In 1925, following pioneering work with Hendrik Kramers, Heisenberg developed matrix mechanics, which replaced the ad hoc old quantum theory with modern quantum mechanics. The central premise was that the classical concept of motion does not fit at the quantum level, as electrons in an atom do not travel on sharply defined orbits. Rather, their motion is smeared out in a strange way: the Fourier transform of its time dependence only involves those frequencies that could be observed in the quantum jumps of their radiation.

Heisenberg's paper did not admit any unobservable quantities like the exact position of the electron in an orbit at any time; he only allowed the theorist to talk about the Fourier components of the motion. Since the Fourier components were not defined at the classical frequencies, they could not be used to construct an exact trajectory, so that the formalism could not answer certain overly precise questions about where the electron was or how fast it was going.

According to one account: "Heisenberg's paper marked a radical departure from previous attempts to solve atomic problems by making use of observable quantities only. 'My entire meagre efforts go toward killing off and suitably replacing the concept of the orbital paths that one cannot observe,' he wrote in a letter dated 9 July 1925."

It was actually Einstein who first raised the problem to Heisenberg in 1926 upon their first real discussion.  Einstein had invited Heisenberg to his home for a discussion of matrix mechanics upon its introduction.  As Heisenberg describes the discussion:   "On the way home, he questioned me about my background, my studies with Sommerfeld.  But on arrival he at once began with a central question about the philosophical foundation of the new quantum mechanics.  He pointed out to me that in my mathematical description the notion of 'electron path' did not occur at all, but that in a cloud-chamber the track of the electron can of course be observed directly.  It seemed to him absurd to claim that there was indeed an electron path in the cloud-chamber, but none in the interior of the atom." In this situation, of course, we [Heisenberg and Bohr] had many discussions, difficult discussions, because we all felt that the mathematical scheme of quantum or wave mechanics was already final.  It could not be changed, and we would have to do all our calculations from this scheme.  On the other hand, nobody knew how to represent in this scheme such a simple case as the path of an electron through a cloud chamber."

In March 1926, working in Bohr's institute, Heisenberg realized that the non-commutativity implies the uncertainty principle. This implication provided a clear physical interpretation for the non-commutativity, and it laid the foundation for what became known as the Copenhagen interpretation of quantum mechanics. Heisenberg showed that the commutation relation implies an uncertainty, or in Bohr's language a complementarity. Any two variables that do not commute cannot be measured simultaneously—the more precisely one is known, the less precisely the other can be known. Heisenberg wrote:It can be expressed in its simplest form as follows: One can never know with perfect accuracy both of those two important factors which determine the movement of one of the smallest particles—its position and its velocity. It is impossible to determine accurately both the position and the direction and speed of a particle at the same instant.

In his celebrated 1927 paper, "Über den anschaulichen Inhalt der quantentheoretischen Kinematik und Mechanik" ("On the Perceptual Content of Quantum Theoretical Kinematics and Mechanics"), Heisenberg established this expression as the minimum amount of unavoidable momentum disturbance caused by any position measurement, but he did not give a precise definition for the uncertainties Δx and Δp. Instead, he gave some plausible estimates in each case separately. In his Chicago lecture he refined his principle:

Kennard in 1927 first proved the modern inequality:

Heisenberg only proved relation for the special case of Gaussian states.

Terminology and translation
Throughout the main body of his original 1927 paper, written in German, Heisenberg used the word "Ungenauigkeit" ("indeterminacy"),
to describe the basic theoretical principle. Only in the endnote did he switch to the word "Unsicherheit" ("uncertainty"). When the English-language version of Heisenberg's textbook, The Physical Principles of the Quantum Theory, was published in 1930, however, the translation "uncertainty" was used, and it became the more commonly used term in the English language thereafter.

Heisenberg's microscope

The principle is quite counter-intuitive, so the early students of quantum theory had to be reassured that naive measurements to violate it were bound always to be unworkable. One way in which Heisenberg originally illustrated the intrinsic impossibility of violating the uncertainty principle is by utilizing the observer effect of an imaginary microscope as a measuring device.

He imagines an experimenter trying to measure the position and momentum of an electron by shooting a photon at it.
 Problem 1 – If the photon has a short wavelength, and therefore, a large momentum, the position can be measured accurately. But the photon scatters in a random direction, transferring a large and uncertain amount of momentum to the electron. If the photon has a long wavelength and low momentum, the collision does not disturb the electron's momentum very much, but the scattering will reveal its position only vaguely.
 Problem 2 – If a large aperture is used for the microscope, the electron's location can be well resolved (see Rayleigh criterion); but by the principle of conservation of momentum, the transverse momentum of the incoming photon affects the electron's beamline momentum and hence, the new momentum of the electron resolves poorly. If a small aperture is used, the accuracy of both resolutions is the other way around.

The combination of these trade-offs implies that no matter what photon wavelength and aperture size are used, the product of the uncertainty in measured position and measured momentum is greater than or equal to a lower limit, which is (up to a small numerical factor) equal to Planck's constant. Heisenberg did not care to formulate the uncertainty principle as an exact limit, and preferred to use it instead, as a heuristic quantitative statement, correct up to small numerical factors, which makes the radically new noncommutativity of quantum mechanics inevitable.

Critical reactions

The Copenhagen interpretation of quantum mechanics and Heisenberg's Uncertainty Principle were, in fact, seen as twin targets by detractors who believed in an underlying determinism and realism. According to the Copenhagen interpretation of quantum mechanics, there is no fundamental reality that the quantum state describes, just a prescription for calculating experimental results. There is no way to say what the state of a system fundamentally is, only what the result of observations might be.

Albert Einstein believed that randomness is a reflection of our ignorance of some fundamental property of reality, while Niels Bohr believed that the probability distributions are fundamental and irreducible, and depend on which measurements we choose to perform. Einstein and Bohr debated the uncertainty principle for many years.

The ideal of the detached observer
Wolfgang Pauli called Einstein's fundamental objection to the uncertainty principle "the ideal of the detached observer" (phrase translated from the German):

Einstein's slit
The first of Einstein's thought experiments challenging the uncertainty principle went as follows:

Consider a particle passing through a slit of width . The slit introduces an uncertainty in momentum of approximately  because the particle passes through the wall. But let us determine the momentum of the particle by measuring the recoil of the wall. In doing so, we find the momentum of the particle to arbitrary accuracy by conservation of momentum.

Bohr's response was that the wall is quantum mechanical as well, and that to measure the recoil to accuracy , the momentum of the wall must be known to this accuracy before the particle passes through.

A similar analysis with particles diffracting through multiple slits is given by Richard Feynman.

Einstein's box
Bohr was present when Einstein proposed the thought experiment which has become known as Einstein's box. Einstein argued that "Heisenberg's uncertainty equation implied that the uncertainty in time was related to the uncertainty in energy, the product of the two being related to Planck's constant." Consider, he said, an ideal box, lined with mirrors so that it can contain light indefinitely. The box could be weighed before a clockwork mechanism opened an ideal shutter at a chosen instant to allow one single photon to escape. "We now know, explained Einstein, precisely the time at which the photon left the box." "Now, weigh the box again. The change of mass tells the energy of the emitted light. In this manner, said Einstein, one could measure the energy emitted and the time it was released with any desired precision, in contradiction to the uncertainty principle."

Bohr spent a sleepless night considering this argument, and eventually realized that it was flawed. He pointed out that if the box were to be weighed, say by a spring and a pointer on a scale, "since the box must move vertically with a change in its weight, there will be uncertainty in its vertical velocity and therefore an uncertainty in its height above the table. ... Furthermore, the uncertainty about the elevation above the Earth's surface will result in an uncertainty in the rate of the clock," because of Einstein's own theory of gravity's effect on time.
"Through this chain of uncertainties, Bohr showed that Einstein's light box experiment could not simultaneously measure exactly both the energy of the photon and the time of its escape."

EPR paradox for entangled particles

Bohr was compelled to modify his understanding of the uncertainty principle after another thought experiment by Einstein. In 1935, Einstein, Podolsky and Rosen published an analysis of widely separated entangled particles (EPR paradox). Measuring one particle, Einstein realized, would alter the probability distribution of the other, yet here the other particle could not possibly be disturbed. This example led Bohr to revise his understanding of the principle, concluding that the uncertainty was not caused by a direct interaction.

But Einstein came to much more far-reaching conclusions from the same thought experiment. He believed the "natural basic assumption" that a complete description of reality would have to predict the results of experiments from "locally changing deterministic quantities" and therefore would have to include more information than the maximum possible allowed by the uncertainty principle.

In 1964, John Stewart Bell showed that this assumption can be falsified, since it would imply a certain inequality between the probabilities of different experiments. Experimental results confirm the predictions of quantum mechanics, ruling out Einstein's basic assumption that led him to the suggestion of his hidden variables. These hidden variables may be "hidden" because of an illusion that occurs during observations of objects that are too large or too small. This illusion can be likened to rotating fan blades that seem to pop in and out of existence at different locations and sometimes seem to be in the same place at the same time when observed. This same illusion manifests itself in the observation of subatomic particles. Both the fan blades and the subatomic particles are moving so fast that the illusion is seen by the observer. Therefore, it is possible that there would be predictability of the subatomic particles behavior and characteristics to a recording device capable of very high speed tracking....Ironically this fact is one of the best pieces of evidence supporting Karl Popper's philosophy of invalidation of a theory by falsification-experiments. That is to say, here Einstein's "basic assumption" became falsified by experiments based on Bell's inequalities. For the objections of Karl Popper to the Heisenberg inequality itself, see below.

While it is possible to assume that quantum mechanical predictions are due to nonlocal, hidden variables, and in fact David Bohm invented such a formulation, this resolution is not satisfactory to the vast majority of physicists. The question of whether a random outcome is predetermined by a nonlocal theory can be philosophical, and it can be potentially intractable. If the hidden variables were not constrained, they could just be a list of random digits that are used to produce the measurement outcomes. To make it sensible, the assumption of nonlocal hidden variables is sometimes augmented by a second assumption—that the size of the observable universe puts a limit on the computations that these variables can do. A nonlocal theory of this sort predicts that a quantum computer would encounter fundamental obstacles when attempting to factor numbers of approximately 10,000 digits or more; a potentially achievable task in quantum mechanics.

Popper's criticism

Karl Popper approached the problem of indeterminacy as a logician and metaphysical realist. He disagreed with the application of the uncertainty relations to individual particles rather than to ensembles of identically prepared particles, referring to them as "statistical scatter relations". In this statistical interpretation, a particular measurement may be made to arbitrary precision without invalidating the quantum theory. This directly contrasts with the Copenhagen interpretation of quantum mechanics, which is non-deterministic but lacks local hidden variables.

In 1934, Popper published Zur Kritik der Ungenauigkeitsrelationen (Critique of the Uncertainty Relations) in Naturwissenschaften, and in the same year Logik der Forschung (translated and updated by the author as The Logic of Scientific Discovery in 1959), outlining his arguments for the statistical interpretation. In 1982, he further developed his theory in Quantum theory and the schism in Physics, writing:
[Heisenberg's] formulae are, beyond all doubt, derivable statistical formulae of the quantum theory. But they have been habitually misinterpreted by those quantum theorists who said that these formulae can be interpreted as determining some upper limit to the precision of our measurements. [original emphasis]

Popper proposed an experiment to falsify the uncertainty relations, although he later withdrew his initial version after discussions with Weizsäcker, Heisenberg, and Einstein; this experiment may have influenced the formulation of the EPR experiment.

Many-worlds uncertainty

The many-worlds interpretation originally outlined by Hugh Everett III in 1957 is partly meant to reconcile the differences between Einstein's and Bohr's views by replacing Bohr's wave function collapse with an ensemble of deterministic and independent universes whose distribution is governed by wave functions and the Schrödinger equation. Thus, uncertainty in the many-worlds interpretation follows from each observer within any universe having no knowledge of what goes on in the other universes.

Free will
Some scientists including Arthur Compton and Martin Heisenberg have suggested that the uncertainty principle, or at least the general probabilistic nature of quantum mechanics, could be evidence for the two-stage model of free will. One critique, however, is that apart from the basic role of quantum mechanics as a foundation for chemistry, nontrivial biological mechanisms requiring quantum mechanics are unlikely, due to the rapid decoherence time of quantum systems at room temperature. Proponents of this theory commonly say that this decoherence is overcome by both screening and decoherence-free subspaces found in biological cells.

Thermodynamics
There is reason to believe that violating the uncertainty principle also strongly implies the violation of the second law of thermodynamics. See Gibbs paradox.

See also

 Afshar experiment
 Canonical commutation relation
 Correspondence principle
 Gromov's non-squeezing theorem
 Discrete Fourier transform#Uncertainty principles
 Einstein's thought experiments
 Heisenbug
 Introduction to quantum mechanics
 Küpfmüller's uncertainty principle
 Operationalization
 Observer effect (information technology)
 Observer effect (physics)
 Quantum indeterminacy
 Quantum non-equilibrium
 Quantum tunnelling
 Physics and Beyond (book)
 Planck length
 Stronger uncertainty relations
 Weak measurement

Notes

References

External links

 
 Matter as a Wave – a chapter from an online textbook
 Quantum mechanics: Myths and facts
 Stanford Encyclopedia of Philosophy entry
 Fourier Transforms and Uncertainty at MathPages
 aip.org: Quantum mechanics 1925–1927 – The uncertainty principle 
 Eric Weisstein's World of Physics – Uncertainty principle
 John Baez on the time–energy uncertainty relation
 The certainty principle
 Common Interpretation of Heisenberg's Uncertainty Principle Is Proved False

Quantum mechanics
Principles
Mathematical physics
Inequalities
Werner Heisenberg
Scientific laws
1927 in science
1927 in Germany